The Indian Pressurized Water Reactor-900 (IPWR-900) is a class of pressurized water reactors being designed by Bhabha Atomic Research Centre (BARC) in partnership with Nuclear Power Corporation of India Limited to supplement the Indian three-stage nuclear power programme

History 

BARC has developed a 83 MW compact light water reactor known as CLWR-B1 for the Indian Navy's Arihant-class submarine program which includes a prototype reactor operating at Kalpakkam since 2002 and was made operational in the INS Arihant in 2013. The experience gained in the naval reactor program is being used to develop a commercial electricity generation reactor of 900 MWe capacity.

To support the industrial capacity to fabricate the large forgings for a reactor pressure vessel, a heavy forge unit has been set up as a joint venture by the Nuclear Power Corporation of India Limited and Indian engineering conglomerate Larsen & Toubro's subsidiary L&T Special Steels and Heavy Forgings Limited in Hazira, Gujarat. The joint venture has set up a 9000-ton forging press and plans to increase it to 17,000 tons. BARC reported the completion of manufacture of test forgings in August 2021 and confirmed the technological know-how and capability to manufacture forgings of thicknesses 350 mm to 750 mm essential to manufacturing of reactor pressure vessels for pressurized water reactor program.

Indian nuclear activities regulator Atomic Energy Regulatory Board carried out the Pre-Consenting design review for the design in the fiscal year 2015–16.

Design 

The IPWR design is planned to retain commonality of majority of non-nuclear island components of the design with the IPHWR-700 pressurized heavy-water reactors currently in use to limit design timelines and construction costs. The steam generator design and configuration will also be adopted from the IPHWR-700 design.

The IPWR core consists 151 fuel assemblies arranged in a hexagonal pitch with 331 lattice locations wherein 311 locations are occupied by fuel pins, 18 by control guide tubes and 1 by instrumentation tube and the remaining location at centre is occupied by central water rod. The fuel pins have an outer diameter 9.4 mm with a wall thickness of 0.7 mm. The core contains 103 rod cluster assemblies with each cluster containingf 18 rods which have B4C and Dy2O3·TiO2 as the control material. The control rods have been designed to provide negative reactivity coefficients with a shutdown margin of 10 mk at hot zero power state for a prolonged time.

IPWR utilises Gadolinium(Gd) compound Gd2O3(Gadolinia) as a neutron absorber for suppression of initial reactivity which is a prominent feature of modern PWR designs including EPR and AP1000. The use of Gd reduces concentration of dissolved boron required at the beginning of the fuel cycle and helps keep the coolant temperature coefcient of reactivity sufficiently negative in all operating conditions.

The reactor will utilise a reactor pressure vessel made of 20MnMoNi55 steel also known as “APURVA” (Advanced Purified
Reactor Vessel Alloy). BARC disclosed in January 2020 that a Core catcher design has been validated that can manage a 100% core melt accident.

The design will include Generation III+ safety features like Passive Decay Heat Removal System, Emergency Core Cooling System (ECCS), Corium Retention and Core Catcher System.

Reactor fleet 

Government of India or NPCIL have not disclosed any locations or timeline for the construction of the first IPWR-900 reactor.

Technical specifications

See also
 IPHWR, a class of Indian PHWRs.
 AHWR-300, thorium fuelled PHWR design for the Indian Three stage nuclear power programme
 India's three-stage nuclear power programme
 Nuclear power in India
 AP1000, similar reactor of US origin
 EPR, similar reactor of European origin

References 

Nuclear power reactor types